Opinion polling for the 2010 Czech legislative election started immediately after the 2006 legislative election.

Opinion polls

Seats

Preferred Prime Minister polling

Other surveys

References

2010